Sipocot, officially the Municipality of Sipocot, is a 1st class municipality in the province of Camarines Sur, Philippines. According to the 2020 census, it has a population of 68,169 people.

History
In the early decades of 20th century, archaeological studies conducted between the Sipocot and Libmanan area netted Chinese funereal artifacts of either 14th or 15th century origin.  The historical finds suggest that the area belonged to one of the oldest habitational and thickly populated sites long before the arrival of the Spaniards.  In fact, small cluster of villages within the jurisdiction of Sipocot had been in existence when the initial group of Spanish encomenderos penetrated the region.  These villages, which now comprise Sipocot, were Sacalacvangan (Calagbangan), Caanip (Anib), Cabilindi (Hindi), and Caysian (Taisan), among others.

Early on, due to its remote and almost inaccessible location, Sipocot lagged behind Libmanan and Lupi in its progression as pueblo.  Sipocot first appeared in the Spanish charts as a visita or barrio of Lupi, which seceded from Libmanan and became an independent parish in 1726.  

However, because of the need for regular spiritual service and access to colonial institution, church and local government, the local residents clamored for Sipocot to be accorded township.  At that time, the distant town of Lupi was the nearest seat of government and church, which can be reached solely by trekking rugged mountain trails.  Finally, on June 3, 1801, by virtue of the proclamation issued by Governor-General Rafael Maria de Aguilar, Sipocot became a Pueblo and a Franciscan curacy.  However, in spite of its upgraded status as pueblo, Sipocot was slow to develop and remained outside the edge of regional affairs throughout the rest of the Spanish regime. The lethargic development of Sipocot can be attributed to its location which is beyond the mainstream of colonial commerce, and to the time when it was created as a pueblo which was considered late in the colonial timeline.  In fact, Sipocot was one of the last few towns to be created in the Bicol Region during the Spanish regime. 

The 1896 Philippine Revolution against the Spanish regime gave birth to the revolutionary government of Sipocot headed by Capitan Mariano de los Santos as its Presidente Municipal.  However, after the Filipino-American War, Mariano de los Santos was appointed as Municipal President of Sipocot in 1901 by the Philippine Commission.  From 1905 up to the Commonwealth Period that lasted until 1942, all Municipal Presidents of Sipocot were duly elected by popular vote.  Although the American Regime lasted only for a little over forty years, it provided significant contribution in the establishment in Sipocot of secular and free public school; expansion of bureaucratic agencies, which gave young professionals employment opportunities in the government; setting up of civil government and democratic reforms; and utilization of natural resources for economic enterprise and investment.

The Japanese occupation of Sipocot happened on December 19, 1941, when a battalion of Japanese soldiers from Legazpi reached the municipality.  They established weapons depot in Impig, a garrison in Malubago, and a main garrison consisting of several houses in the Poblacion which served as lodging for their troops. 

Because the Japanese were at first friendly and diplomatic, the residents of Sipocot, unlike the people in other municipalities, were less aggressive to the Japanese, and in fact, they established rapport with them.  For that reason, the Japanese were able to persuade a number of local officials to serve under their rule; thus, the local government of Sipocot functioned during war time.    

However, when the guerrilla resistance movements in the area intensified their military operations and ambuscades against the invading troops, the Japanese resorted to coercive and violent means to instil discipline and cooperation on the local residents.  The Japanese commandeered public and private properties and buildings for their military needs.  School buildings and campuses were used as military quarters, which caused the suspension of classes.  They enslaved transient male travelers to work in their public works projects without pay and under duress.   Apart from these harsh impositions was the infamy the municipality got as it came to be known as “Little Tokyo”, a place where Japanese troops indulged in short carnal relaxation whenever they stopped by Sipocot from Naga on their way to the northern part of the country.  However, in fairness to the Japanese forces, aside from the reported tortures and killings in the municipality of guerrillas captured from neighboring municipalities, reports of atrocities committed by the Japanese in Sipocot were surprisingly rare.    

On the other hand, during their short-lived occupation of Sipocot the Japanese gave some positive contributions to the municipality in the field of public works. Japanese engineers rebuilt the Sipocot Bridge.  They also repaired the railroad tracks situated in Sipocot that connected Legazpi to Manila. 

However, it was widely believed that these projects were undertaken not for the benefit of the local population but to consolidate Japanese control of the region and facilitate troop mobility.

On the morning of April 28, 1944, eight trucks of American soldiers arrived in Sipocot and liberated the town from the Japanese forces.

At the end of the Second World War, Sipocot was quick to recover since it suffered no significant human casualties and only minimal loss of properties considering that it was spared from bombardment and no major battle was fought in the municipality.   Besides said good fortune, the convergence of other factors influenced the gradual but sustained development of Sipocot, such as the shift in the mode of transportation from water to land; the booming economy of the United States and the development of the local construction industry; and, the election of Mayor Pablo Salazar as its post war Municipal Mayor. 

At the turn of the century, the shift in the mode of travel from water to land gave rise to rail road systems and road networks that crisscrossed the territorial domain of Sipocot, making it the central transit point in the first district of the province as well as major conduit to various destinations in the northern and southern portions of Luzon.

As the American economy grew before World War II, the need for timber to sustain its growth placed the forest resources of Camarines Sur and Camarines Norte at the fore front of American investment in the region.  Sipocot, which had an abundant forest resources whose potentials have been long ignored, became haven for logging companies which provided employment to local residents as well as migrants.  Later, as the local construction industry boomed, particularly the extension of the railway system to the whole Bicol Region, the logging industry in Sipocot progressed even more.  At the height of its commercial success, the logging industry in Sipocot has at least five (5) sawmills employing hundreds of workers and producing a combined average output of 150,000 board feet of daily. In the 1950s, with its income of least P35,000.00 annually, mostly derived from logging industry, Sipocot was reclassified into second class municipality from its previous fourth class municipality classification before the war.  

The post war Municipal Mayor of Sipocot, Mayor Salazar, was a visionary and progressive-minded leader.  He enticed many people from other municipalities and provinces as far as the Tagalog Region with a promise of five-hectare fertile and cultivatable public land for every family who will come and settle in Sipocot.  The migrants who came and settled in Sipocot did not only convert the substantial forest spaces of the municipality into farm lots and residential areas, but likewise they contributed greatly to the rapid population growth of the municipality.  From 7,936 inhabitants, based on the 1946 census, the population of Sipocot grew to 32,650, as per 1960 census.  In the same year, Sipocot became sixth most populous town among the 36 towns of the Province of Camarines Sur. 

Today, from its humble beginning as a visita or barrio of Lupi during the Spanish regime, Sipocot has become a first class municipality with the total population of 68,169, as per 2020 census,meaning it is the 8th largest in 35 towns, inhabiting its 24,129 hectares territorial domain.  Moreover, Sipocot is now the most populous and progressive municipality in the 1st District of Camarines Sur.

Geography 
Notable hills include:
 Susong Daraga Hill at Barangay Impig and is near at CBSUA-Sipocot campus
 Overlooking Point at Barangay Manangle located on the left side towards Manila at the Quirino Highway
 Hundred Steps at Barangay Impig
 Friendship Mountain at Barangay Impig

Barangays
Sipocot is politically subdivided into 46 barangays:

Climate

Demographics

Sipocot has a steadily growing population according to charts.

Economy 

Businesses in the town are tourism. Susong Daraga Hill is located in Barangay Impig and is one of the best tourist spots in Sipocot, Overlooking the downtown area or Centro. 

Commercial businesses are heavily concentrated in the town proper. The commercial area stretches from Impig to North Centro to South Centro and to Barangay Tara. The CBD or Central Business District is located in the South Centro Area.

The Main market however is located in the North Centro. Back in the 1940s the 1st district of Camarines Sur's financial center was located in the municipality of Ragay. In 1987 the financial district was relocated to Sipocot. So the town grew rapidly and became at Par with the much larger areas of Daet, Calabanga, Pili, Iriga and Tagkawayan in CALABARZON. 

In 2021 Sipocot had been qualified for cityhood and at present is pending.
 
Banks and financial institutions in Sipocot include Land Bank of the Philippines, Rural Bank of Sipocot, Producers Savings Bank, CARD Bank, BDO Network Bank, BLVING Lending Corporation, M Lhuillier, Palawan Express Pera Padala, Cebuana Lhuillier, Henry Lhuiller, Countrygold Pawnshop and many more.

Prominent establishments in Sipocot includes Tom Eloy Convenient Store, Alson's Trading, Xocio Supermart, Jybon Inasal and may more. 7-11 Convenience Stores are also present with 2 branches in Brgy. North Centro and Tara.

IT BPOs

Lately Sipocot has had a lot of investors flocking to the town because of its strategic location between Daet, Naga City and Manila. There was also a noticeable growth of Call Centers or Business Process Outsourcing. As of 2022 4 BPO companies are in the municipality. The most notable one is located in Barangay Tara which operates day and night with 300 employees

Trade

Sipocot is located along the national highway and this made the town grow. Sipocot is considered the commercial center of Northwestern Camarines Sur because people from Del Gallego, Ragay, Lupi sell their products in the market particularly wood. People from Cabusao trade fish there while Pamplona and Libmanan trade agricultural products there such as rice and corn.

Vision 2035

Mayor Tom Bocago has envisioned the municipality of Sipocot to be a city by the year 2035. He also envisioned that by that year the municipality's assets will reach over ₱1 billion and it's poverty rate will be less than 15%.

Infrastructure

Highways 
The municipality is connected with Manila by the new Andaya Highway and daily rail services to and from Naga & Legazpi are provided by the Philippine National Railways.

In order to spur development in the municipality, The Toll Regulatory Board declared Toll Road 5 the extension of South Luzon Expressway. A 420-kilometer, four lane expressway starting from the terminal point of the now under construction SLEX Toll Road 4 at Barangay Mayao, Lucena City in Quezon to Matnog, Sorsogon, near the Matnog Ferry Terminal. On August 25, 2020, San Miguel Corporation announced that they will invest the project which will reduce travel time from Lucena to Matnog from 9 hours to 5.5 hours.

Another expressway that will serve Metro Naga is the Quezon-Bicol Expressway (QuBEx), which will link between Lucena and San Fernando, Camarines Sur.

Communications 
 Digitel Communications, BayanTel and PLDT provide the telephone services including DSL, Broadband, and Dial-up internet services
 Using of Cellular phones is one of the important medium of communication in the area, it is being powered by DITO Telecom, Smart Communications, Sun Cellular and Globe Telecom, (it also includes the Talk N Text, Touch Mobile, etc.)
 The municipality also have this Post Office located at the Municipal Compound with 4408 as the Zip Code.
 The area is accessible via buses, jeepneys, tricycles, trains, skates, etc. for public transportation vehicles.
 The cable TV is also available, it is being powered by Dream Satellite TV, Sky Cable and Cignal. In the area GMA is the leading TV station after the shutdown of ABS-CBN.

Healthcare

Hospitals
 Sipocot District Hospital
 Our Lady of Salvation Hospital
 Rural Health Unit

Lying-In Clinic
 Frydt Lying-In Clinic
 Ronjay Birthing Clinic (Brgy. Tara and Brgy. Calagbangan)

Veterinary Clinic
 Charming Pets Veterinary Clinic

Education

Tertiary schools 
 Felix O. Alfelor Sr. Foundation College, located at Barangay South Centro
Central Bicol State University of Agriculture - Sipocot (Bicol Institute of Science and Technology), located at Barangay Impig. This college has a transition name: Central Bicol State University of Agriculture - Sipocot (2009–Present); Camarines Sur State Agricultural Colleges - Sipocot Campus (2003–2009); Bicol Institute of Science and Technology (1992–2003); Sipocot National School of Arts and Trades (1972–1992); Sipocot Normal University (1938 to 1972)

Secondary schools 
 CBSUA-Sipocot Laboratory High School (Sipocot)
 Felix O. Alfelor Sr. Foundation College - High School Dept., located at Barangay South Centro
 Sipocot National High School, located at Barangay Tara
 Villazar National High School, located at Barangay North Villazar
 Manangle National High School, Located at Barangay Manangle
 Sacred Heart High School, located at Barangay Calagbangan (supervised by the Villazar National High School administration, de jure)
 Bolo Norte High School, located at Barangay Bolo Norte (supervised by the Sipocot National High School administration, de jure)
 Anib National High School, located at Barangay Anib
 Caima National High School High School, located at Barangay Caima

Primary public schools 
 Every barangay has its own elementary schools.  Schools are divided into two districts: Sipocot North District (schools in the northern part of the town) and the Sipocot South District (most of the southern part).

Primary private schools 
 Christian Mission Service Philippines School
 Felix O. Alfelor Sr. Foundation College - Elementary School Department
 King Thomas Learning Academy, Inc
 Nazareth Institute of Learning & Formation
 Serranz Learning Center

References

External links

 [ Philippine Standard Geographic Code]
Philippine Census Information
Official Site of the Province of Camarines Sur

Municipalities of Camarines Sur